Fagerås is a locality situated in Kil Municipality, Värmland County, Sweden with 427 inhabitants in 2010.

References 

Populated places in Värmland County
Populated places in Kil Municipality